is the second single by J-pop group Yoshimotozaka46. The single was released on 8 May 2019. Like the previous single, the title track features Tsukasa Saito and Haruna Ogawa, both owarai comedians, in the center position. The track is also the theme song of the Japanese-dubbed version of the 2019 film Men in Black: International.

Release 
The single was released in three versions: senbatsu, RED, and regular. The senbatsu edition features the singers of "Konya wa Eeyan" on the cover, while the RED edition features RED, the subunit of Yoshimotozaka46 that performed the B-side "Yaruki no Nai Ai o Thank You!", on the cover. Both editions were bundled with a DVD containing the music video of their respective songs. The regular edition features the subunit Sweet Monster", performers of the song "Genzaichi", on the cover and does not include the song "Ikemen Kishidan".

Track listing 
All lyrics written by Yasushi Akimoto.

Senbatsu and RED editions

Regular edition

Charts performance
Oricon

Billboard Japan

References

2019 singles
2019 songs
Japanese-language songs
Yoshimotozaka46 songs
Song articles with missing songwriters